In modern Japanese,  principally refers to kanji used to phonetically represent native or borrowed words with less regard to the underlying meaning of the characters. Conversely,  also refers to kanji used semantically without regard to the readings.

For example, the word "sushi" is often written with its  .

Usage 
The Japanese loanword for "coffee" is generally written using the katakana , but on coffee shop signs and menus it may be written with the Chinese word , which is then pronounced irregularly to their normal Japanese reading (their ).

Many characters have gained meanings derived from  usage. For example,  were once widely utilized for foreign place names; such as in the   used to write "Asia".

Phono-semantic matching 

When using  to represent loanwords, the kanji are sometimes chosen for both their semantic and phonetic values, a form of phono-semantic matching. The characters can mean "wings coming together", as the pointed  resembles a bird with wings folded together.

History 
The ad hoc usage of Chinese characters for their phonetic values dates nearly to the introduction of Chinese characters to Japan. Two widespread uses of  came out of this. On one front, scholars and monks used kanji characters as translation aids between the lines of Chinese texts. On the other, poets simply used kanji phonetically to write in Japanese. Many different characters were used with the same sound values.
This system of characters is called , "alphabet of myriad leaves". The  of modern Japanese,  and  developed as organic simplifications of  that were eventually codified.

Sanskrit 
In Buddhist Japanese, Sanskrit terms used in some chants also derive from  but were not called such. These Buddhist texts were translated into Chinese (in a Literary Chinese style) in China long ago. The translation rule for mantras was not to translate the mantra, but instead to represent it phonetically with Chinese characters. For the sutras, they were translated into Chinese Literary Language.

Related concepts 
Whereas  are characters used to represent Japanese or borrowed words without regard to the meaning of those characters,  are readings, typically words, of Japanese origin that have been officially applied to the borrowed Chinese characters, similar to Latin-Germanic origin synonyms in English.

A loanword example is reading  as the English-derived word , or "rival".

For example,  ("spicy, salty") is an adjective requiring the suffix , but may also be spelt as, for example,  (both legitimate  of the characters) on a poster, for example, where there is no intention of inflecting this spelling.

Single-character loan words 

In principle these could be considered as 1-character meaning-only , but because the reading corresponds to a single character, these are considered readings instead. See single character gairaigo for further discussion.

Many borrowed measurement terms may be written as tiny abbreviations stuffed into a single character space called :  (for centimeters),  (for kilo), amongst others.

In a few cases, the etymology of a word is unclear, and hence whether the term is a borrowing or not cannot be determined.

An example of this is writing  ("no, not") before a kanji for a verb, corresponding to the verb inflection  – for example, writing  for   "not knowing".

See also

Japanese exonyms
 in Chinese
Transcription into Chinese characters

References

Further reading
 Painting Worlds and Words by Mia Lewis

Japanese words and phrases
Japanese writing system terms
Kanji
Transliteration